John Cherry Drennan JP DL (born 1899 died 1983) was a unionist politician in Northern Ireland.

Drennan studied at Foyle College before working as a farmer in the Limavady area.  He became active in the Ulster Unionist Party, and served for it in the Senate of Northern Ireland from 1961 until it was prorogued in 1972.

References

1899 births
Year of death missing
Members of the Senate of Northern Ireland 1957–1961
Members of the Senate of Northern Ireland 1961–1965
Members of the Senate of Northern Ireland 1965–1969
Members of the Senate of Northern Ireland 1969–1973
Ulster Unionist Party members of the Senate of Northern Ireland
People educated at Foyle College